"This Heaven" is a song written and recorded by former Pink Floyd lead singer and guitarist, David Gilmour. It is included as the sixth track from his third studio album, and his first post-Pink Floyd solo album, On an Island. It was one of two songs released in the US as promotional CD-Rs in October 2006. The song, along with the entire album, was performed live during Gilmour's 2006 On an Island tour.

Track listing

References 

David Gilmour songs
Songs written by David Gilmour
Songs with lyrics by Polly Samson
Song recordings produced by David Gilmour
Song recordings produced by Chris Thomas (record producer)